The LeeStock Music Festival (originally known as LeeFest) is an annual music festival, held in Long Melford, Suffolk, since 2006 in memory of a local man, Lee Dunford, who died the same year. The festival  raises money for the Willow Foundation, a national charity that gives special days to seriously ill young adults. The festival is part of a number of events that aim to raise the profile of the Willow Foundation and raise money for them including a pub crawl, a football match, and a Twenty20 cricket match. Prior to the 2012 festival, LeeStock has raised £25,000 for the Willow Foundation. 

In 2011, LeeStock was held over the weekend of 28 and 29 May and featured indie band Dodgy and ex-The Bluetones lead-singer Mark Morriss as the headline acts along with acts from all over the UK. It was held at the White Horse public house in Sudbury.

LeeStock 2012 was moved to the larger capacity home ground of A.F.C. Sudbury, King's Marsh, after selling out in 2011. It was headlined by Mark Morriss, Nigel Clark of Dodgy, D:Ream and Wheatus.  The acoustic stage was headlined by Nick Howard who went on to win that year's The Voice of Germany.

In 2013 the festival moved again, to the stately home and National Trust property Melford Hall, in Long Melford. The festival was headlined by Toploader and Space.  By early 2014, the festival had raised almost £50,000 for the Willow Foundation and that year's event, held again at Melford Hall, was headlined by the Lightning Seeds and an acoustic set by Terrorvision.

In late 2014, the headlining act for 2015 was announced as the pop rock band Scouting for Girls. The event in May 2015 was the largest to date and on site camping again sold out over the weekend. 

The 2016 festival saw The Feeling headline with support from The Hoosiers, Lucy Spraggan and The New Town Kings. Tickets sold out in advance for Saturday entry with record numbers also in attendance on the Sunday.  Organisers announced in the week after the event that the total now donated to the Willow Foundation in Memory of Lee Dunford now exceeded £100,000.00.

Now a well established family friendly weekend music festival, the May 2017 edition, again at Melford Hall Park in Suffolk, will be the 10th 'birthday'.

On 4 November, it was announced that 'Toploader' (www.leestock.org/toploader-to-return-to-melford-hall-in-2017) would be returning as a part of the 2017 lineup, with further announcements expected before the end of the year.

References

External links 
 Official Website of the LeeStock Music Festival
 Official Website of the Willow Foundation
 White Horse, Sudbury

Music festivals in Suffolk
Long Melford